The Central National Security Commission (CNSC) of the Central Committee of the Chinese Communist Party (CCP) was established at the 3rd Plenary Session of the 18th Central Committee in November 2013, during what was considered a "major regrouping of the top CCP power structure."

The CNSC aims to consolidate political leadership of all components of the security apparatus controlled by the Communist Party, including those headed formerly by former Politburo Standing Committee (PSC) member Zhou Yongkang. These components would be combined into a single entity under the direct command of the General Secretary of the Chinese Communist Party. According to the Ministry of Foreign Affairs (MFA) spokesman Qin Gang, the NSC aims to combat terrorism, separatism, and religious extremism. It will also deal with national security strategy, crisis management, and links with foreign national security agencies.

Analysts regarded the establishment of the NSC one of the most "concrete" and "eye-catching" outcomes of the Plenary Session, the culmination of a more than decade-long internal debate on whether China should have a national security council. The New York Times described it as "one of the most secretive bodies of a secretive state", whose "size, staffing and powers remain unclear". It has "established local security committees across provinces, cities and counties" to "focus on domestic threats" such as "protests and dissent".

Origins 
The initial conception of the CNSC came during the Jiang Zemin era in 1997, with a proposal by Wang Daohan, later the  president of the Association for Relations Across the Taiwan Straits. Jiang had taken interest in the United States National Security Council during his state visit to the United States that year. Out of concern that the establishment of such a body would give too much power to the leader, who would be head of both the commission and the Central Military Commission, it was never implemented. The proposal was again reconsidered in 1999 after the United States bombing of the Chinese embassy in Belgrade due to concern over how long it took various state security agencies to gather information on the incident and make it known to Chinese leadership.

Xi Jinping later revived the idea as part of his reforms in the foreign policy and security sectors, as part of an attempt to overcome problems that have accumulated for many years. The CNSC would thus fulfill Xi Jinping's ambitions for "Big power diplomacy with Chinese characteristics," rather than the quieter foreign policy agendas of previous administrations. Having a National Security Council assists in China's own "self-identification as a big power in world affairs." This also requires a more advanced diplomatic capability, a task in which the CNSC is supposed to assist in.

Purpose 
The most common explanation for the creation of the CNSC relate to the personal and leadership style of Xi Jinping, and, in the eyes of commentators, his ambition to seize power. These personal factors, however, coincide with China wielding a much greater level of national power. Xi wishes China to play a greater role in world affairs, and so a mechanism like the CNSC would allow it to plan and implement, from the center, "grand strategy" ideas and "big power diplomacy."

Xi Jinping articulated a concept of "big security" in the first meeting of the CNSC on April 15, 2014, saying that China "should take an overall approach to national security, strengthen the confidence of the Chinese people in the path, theories and system of socialism with distinctive Chinese features, and ensure China’s durable peace and stability." These definitions contain meanings of both domestic security and foreign threats.

Membership 
 Chairman
 Xi Jinping, General Secretary of the CCP, President of the People's Republic, Chairman of the Central Military Commission

 Vice Chairmen
 Li Keqiang, Premier of the State Council, Politburo Standing Committee
 Li Zhanshu, Chairman of the National People's Congress  Standing Committee, Politburo Standing Committee

 Members

 General Office Chief
 Ding Xuexiang

References 

Institutions of the Central Committee of the Chinese Communist Party
China